Roger Henrotay (born 28 May 1949) is a retired Belgian footballer from Vivegnis, Liège, Belgium. He was an offensive midfielder in the Standard Liège team of the 1970s, and a Belgian International player.

Henrotay was also the sports manager of Standard Liège between April 1988 and January 1997.

Honours

Player

Club
Standard Liège 
Belgian First Division (3): 1968–69, 1969–70, 1970–71
Belgian League Cup (1): 1974–75
Belgian Cup: Runner-up 1971–72, 1972–73

Manager
Standard Liège
Belgian Cup (1): 1992–93

References

External links
  – Lokeren

1949 births
Living people
Belgian footballers
Standard Liège players
Belgium international footballers
R. Charleroi S.C. players
K.S.C. Lokeren Oost-Vlaanderen players
RFC Liège players
Association football midfielders